The state epidemiologist, or the chief epidemiologist (plural: state epidemiologists or chief epidemiologists) is a Swedish civil servant. The current state epidemiologist is Anders Lindblom, with Anders Wallensten as deputy state epidemiologist.

Initially, the state epidemiologist was the head of the epidemiology department at the State Bacteriological Laboratory at the time of its establishment in 1955. In 1993, the post was transferred to the newly founded agency Institute for Communicable Disease Control. After the Institute was merged with Swedish National Institute of Public Health in 2014, the post became part of the new agency, the Public Health Agency of Sweden.

List of Swedish state epidemiologists
 1956–1976: Bo Zetterberg
 1976–1993: Margareta Böttiger
 1995–2005: Johan Giesecke
 2005–2013: Annika Linde
 2013–2022: Anders Tegnell
 2022–present: Anders Lindblom

See also
  Healthcare in Sweden
  COVID-19 pandemic in Sweden

References

External links 
 Public Health Agency of Sweden

Government of Sweden
Health in Sweden
Swedish civil servants
Swedish epidemiologists
1955 establishments in Sweden